Paragon Software Corporation was an American video game developer based in Greensburg, Pennsylvania. Founded on December 12, 1985, by Mark E. Seremet and Antony Davies, the company was best known for games developed around licenses from Marvel Comics, including The Amazing Spider-Man and Captain America in Dr. Doom's Revenge!, and licenses from Game Designers' Workshop, such as the MegaTraveller series. On July 27, 1992, MicroProse announced that they had acquired Paragon Software, and that the company would be merged into MicroProse as a result of it. The company had 19 employees at the time. The studio's final game, XF5700 Mantis Experimental Fighter, was released under the MicroProse branding on September 2, 1992.

Games

References 

1985 establishments in Pennsylvania
1992 disestablishments in Pennsylvania
Defunct companies based in Pennsylvania
Software companies based in Pennsylvania
Video game companies disestablished in 1992
Video game companies established in 1985
Video game companies of the United States
Video game development companies
American companies disestablished in 1992
American companies established in 1985